Place des Martyrs (French for Martyrs' Square) may refer to:

Places
 Place des Martyrs in Algiers, Algeria
 Place des Martyrs in Beirut, Lebanon
 Place des Martyrs in Brussels, Belgium
 Place des Martyrs in Kisangani, The Congo
 Place des Martyrs in Luxembourg City, Luxembourg
 Place des Martyrs in Verviers, Belgium

Other
Place des Martyres, a series of paintings by Nabil Kanso